The white-browed gnatcatcher (Polioptila bilineata) is a species of bird in the gnatcatcher family Polioptilidae. It is native to central and South America.

This species was formerly considered a subspecies of the tropical gnatcatcher (Polioptila plumbea).

Taxonomy
The white-browed gnatcatcher was formally described in 1850 by the French naturalist Charles Lucien Bonaparte and given the binomial name Sylvia bilineata. Bonaparte specified the locality as Cartagena, a city on the Caribbean coast of Colombia. This species was formerly considered as a subspecies of the tropical gnatcatcher (Polioptila plumbea). The white-browed gnatcatcher was split from the tropical gnatcatcher based on morphology and phylogenetic data.

Five subspecies are recognised:
 Polioptila bilineata brodkorbi Parkes, 1979 – south Mexico to north Costa Rica
 Polioptila bilineata superciliaris Lawrence, 1861 – north-central Costa Rica to north Colombia
 Polioptila bilineata cinericia Wetmore, 1957 – Coiba (island off south Panama)
 Polioptila bilineata bilineata (Bonaparte, 1850) – northwest Colombia to northwest Peru
 Polioptila bilineata daguae Chapman, 1915 – west-central Colombia

References

White-browed gnatcatcher
White-browed gnatcatcher